Massai (also known as: Masai, Massey, Massi, Mah–sii, Massa, Wasse, Wassil or by the nickname "Big Foot" Massai; c. 1847–1906, 1911?) was a member of the Mimbres/Mimbreños local group of the Chihenne band of the Chiricahua Apache.  He was a warrior who was captured but escaped from a train that was sending the scouts and renegades to Florida to be held with Geronimo and Chihuahua.

It is possible that Massai's true Apache name was Nogusea (meaning "crazy", according to Jason Betzinez and James Kaywaykla); he was enlisted as a member of Chatto's band as known as Ma-Che.

Life
Born to White Cloud and Little Star at Mescal Mountain, Arizona, near Globe.  He later married a local Chiricahua and they had two children.  

Massai later met Geronimo, who was recruiting Apache to fight American settlers and soldiers.  Massai and a Tonkawa named Gray Lizard agreed to join Geronimo, who instructed them to lay in supplies of arms, food, and ammunition.  Other sources state that Massai also served the United States government on two occasions, once in 1880 and the other in 1885, as an Apache Scout.  Upon traveling to meet Geronimo's forces, the two were informed that Geronimo had been arrested.  Both men were arrested by Chiricahua Apache Scouts and disarmed.  Massai was placed onto a prison train as a prisoner of war along with Gray Lizard, who voluntarily agreed to accompany Massai, together with the remaining Chiricahua Apache who had either been captured or had surrendered to the army.  This included the Apache Scouts, who were now deemed expendable and undesirable.    

Massai and Gray Lizard later escaped from the prison train near Saint Louis, Missouri. The two men walked some 1,200 miles back to the Mescalero Apache tribal area, crossing the Pecos River, and Capitan Gap. Near Sierra Blanca, New Mexico, the two men encountered a group of Mescalero Apache.  Several days later, the two parted at Three Rivers, never to see each other again.  Gray Lizard departed for Mescal Mountain and the San Carlos Indian Reservation near present-day Globe, Arizona, while Massai stayed on the run, raiding along what is today the New Mexico-Arizona border, and periodically taking refuge across the border in Mexico.  His name appeared in San Carlos Agency reports from 1887 to 1890.  He later kidnapped and married (c.1887) a Mescalero Apache girl named Zan-a-go-li-che and took her home to his family at Mescal Mountain.  Massai and Zanagoliche had six children together.

Demise
Massai's later life and death are the subject of some dispute.  One account states that in 1906,  Massai, after contracting tuberculosis, took his wife and their children back to their home with the Mescaleros in New Mexico.  Along the way he was killed by a posse, west of the town of San Marcial, New Mexico, between Socorro and Hot Springs, though no evidence of Massai's death was ever produced. Some believed the Apache Kid was actually the man who died that day so the area was later named the Apache Kid Wilderness.

Another account states that Massai escaped over the border to Mexico, eventually settling in the Sierra Madre mountains with a group of rebellious Chiricahuas who had refused to surrender with Geronimo.

In popular culture
Massai was portrayed (in brownface) by Burt Lancaster in the 1954 film Apache.

See also
Apache Campaign (1896)
Kelvin Grade Massacre
List of fugitives from justice who disappeared
Renegade period of the Apache Wars

References

1911 deaths
American folklore
Apache Wars
Chiricahua people
Fugitives
History of Arizona
Native American people of the Indian Wars
Outlaws of the American Old West
People from Globe, Arizona
United States Army Indian Scouts
Year of birth uncertain